Food Giant may refer to:

 Food Giant (UK retailer), a defunct supermarket chain owned by Somerfield
 Food Giant (Missouri retailer), an American chain owned by Houchens Industries

See also
 Giant Food (disambiguation)